Laurent Saint-Martin (born 22 June 1985) is a French politician who has been serving as head of Business France since 2022. 

Saint-Martin previously represented the 3rd constituency of the Val-de-Marne department in the National Assembly from 2017 to 2022. A member of La République En Marche! (LREM), he has served as a regional councillor of Île-de-France since 2021.

Political career
From 2009 until 2012, Saint-Martin was a member of the Socialist Party. However, he was not actively involved in politics before he joined La République En Marche! in 2016. 

In the 2017 legislative election, Saint-Martin was elected to the National Assembly, where he represented the 3rd constituency of Val-de-Marne. He succeeded Roger-Gérard Schwartzenberg of the Radical Party of the Left. In Parliament, Saint-Martin served as a member of the Finance Committee. In addition to his committee assignments, he was part of the French-Peruvian Parliamentary Friendship Group.

In late 2018, Saint-Martin was offered to join the government of Prime Minister Édouard Philippe but declined a post as Secretary of State at the Ministry of the Economy and Finance under the leadership of Bruno Le Maire. In June 2019, Philippe entrusted him with a mission to reform the national system for the identification, seizure and confiscation of criminal assets. From 2020, Saint-Martin served as the Parliament's lead rapporteur on the annual budget of France; he succeeded Joël Giraud.

Within his party, Saint-Martin became a member of the executive board in 2019. In that capacity, he was entrusted alongside Guillaume Chiche for the party's policy planning.

In early 2021, Saint-Martin emerged as the frontrunner in the race to lead the La République En Marche! campaign in Île-de-France during that year's regional elections and to potentially succeed Valérie Pécresse as President of the Regional Council of Île-de-France. With only 9.62 percent of the vote, he ultimately lost against Pécresse but was elected as a regional councillor.

In the 2022 legislative election, Saint-Martin ran for reelection to the National Assembly but lost his seat to Louis Boyard of La France Insoumise.

Life after politics
In 2022, Saint-Martin was appointed to head Business France.

Political positions
In 2018, Saint-Martin was one of Stanislas Guerini's first supporters when the latter ran for the post of LREM leader.

See also
 2017 French legislative election

References

1985 births
Living people
Deputies of the 15th National Assembly of the French Fifth Republic
Socialist Party (France) politicians
La République En Marche! politicians
Politicians from Toulouse
Members of the Regional Council of Île-de-France